Mohammed Al-Oufi (born 8 August 2002) is a Saudi Arabian footballer who plays as a left back for Saudi Pro League side Al-Adalah on loan from Al-Ittihad.

Career
On 18 August 2022, Al-Oufi joined Pro League side Al-Adalah on a season long loan from Al-Ittihad.

References

External links
 

2002 births
Living people
Saudi Arabian footballers
Saudi Arabia youth international footballers
Association football fullbacks
Saudi Professional League players
Ittihad FC players
Al-Adalah FC players